Chaptelat is a commune in the Haute-Vienne department in the Nouvelle-Aquitaine region in western France.

See also
Communes of the Haute-Vienne department

References

External links
 Hall Chaptelat 
Mayor agenda 

Communes of Haute-Vienne